The 2019–20 NBL season was the 42nd season for the Illawarra Hawks in the NBL.

Roster

Depth chart

Preseason 

The Hawks started their preseason later than most teams, with their first game on 7 September. They played three regular preseason games (two of which were against other NBL teams) before playing in the NBL Blitz against Melbourne United and the Perth Wildcats. The Hawks then continued their preseason with a final regular game against the Sydney Kings, however opted against playing more games in the NBLxNBA series.

Ladder

Game log 

|- style="background-color:#ccffcc;"
| 1
| 7 September
| Indigenous All Stars
| W 110-87
| Todd Blanchfield (14)
| David Andersen (8)
| Emmett Naar (6)
| WIN Entertainment Centre
| 1-0
|- style="background-color:#ffcccc;"
| 2
| 13 September
| @ Melbourne United
| L 111-70
| LaMelo Ball (14)
| Samson Froling (8)
| Aaron Brooks (4)
| Ballarat Sports Events Centre
| 1-1
|- style="background-color:#ccffcc;"
| 3
| 15 September
| @ South East Melbourne Phoenix
| W 98-109
| Josh Boone (22)
| Andrew Ogilvy, Josh Boone (8)
| Josh Boone (6)
| Lauren Jackson Sports Centre
| 2-1

|- style="background-color:#ccffcc;"
| 1
| 20 September
| Perth Wildcats
| W 122-119
| Todd Blanchfield (24)
| LaMelo Ball (13)
| LaMelo Ball, Andrew Ogilvy (7)
| Kingborough Sports Centre
| 1-0
|- style="background-color:#ffcccc;"
| 2
| 22 September
| Melbourne United
| L 110-91
| Angus Glover (17)
| Tim Coenraad (6)
| Emmett Naar (6)
| Derwent Entertainment Centre
| 1-1

|- style="background-color:#ffcccc;"
| 4
| 29 September
| Sydney Kings
| L 96-106
| Aaron Brooks (28)
| Josh Boone (7)
| Emmett Naar (7)
| WIN Entertainment Centre
| 2-2

Regular season 

The regular season of the NBL consisted of 28 games, with the Hawks's hosting 13 home games at the WIN Entertainment Centre and one at AIS Arena.

Standings

Game log 

|- style="background-color:#ffcccc;"
| 1
| 6 October
| Brisbane Bullets
| L 81-90
| Aaron Brooks (23)
| LaMelo Ball (10)
| LaMelo Ball (5)
| WIN Entertainment Centre 
| 0-1
|- style="background-color:#ffcccc;"
| 2
| 11 October
| @ Perth Wildcats
| L 103-76
| LaMelo Ball (15)
| Josh Boone (12)
| LaMelo Ball (8)
| RAC Arena
| 0-2
|- style="background-color:#ccffcc;"
| 3
| 14 October
| Cairns Taipans
| W 89-88
| Todd Blanchfield (20)
| Andrew Ogilvy (6)
| Aaron Brooks (6)
| WIN Entertainment Centre
| 1-2 
|- style="background-color:#ffcccc;"
| 4
| 19 October
| @ South East Melbourne Phoenix
| L 106-102
| Aaron Brooks (23)
| LaMelo Ball (7)
| Aaron Brooks (5)
| Melbourne Arena
| 1-3
|- style="background-color:#ffcccc;"
| 5
| 21 October
| Adelaide 36ers
| L 92-98
| Aaron Brooks (31)
| Ball, Brooks, Froling, Ogilvy (5)
| LaMelo Ball (7)
| WIN Entertainment Centre
| 1-4
|- style="background-color:#ffcccc;"
| 6
| 24 October
| @ New Zealand Breakers
| L 103-72
| Aaron Brooks (19)
| LaMelo Ball (7)
| LaMelo Ball (4)
| Spark Arena 
| 1-5
|- style="background-color:#ffcccc;"
| 7
| 27 October
| Perth Wildcats
| L 76-81
| Tim Coenraad (18)
| LaMelo Ball (10)
| LaMelo Ball (7)
| WIN Entertainment Centre
| 1-6

|- style="background-color:#ffcccc;"
| 8
| 3 November
| Brisbane Bullets
| L 69-83
| LaMelo Ball (19)
| LaMelo Ball (9)
| LaMelo Ball (5)
| AIS Arena
| 1-7
|- style="background-color:#ccffcc;"
| 9
| 9 November
| @ Cairns Taipans
| W 91-101
| LaMelo Ball (24)
| John Boone, Andrew Ogilvy (9)
| LaMelo Ball (9)
| Cairns Convention Centre
| 2-7
|- style="background-color:#ffcccc;"
| 10
| 17 November
| @ Sydney Kings
| L 92-87
| Todd Blanchfield (22)
| Andrew Ogilvy (13)
| LaMelo Ball (6)
| Qudos Bank Arena
| 2-8
|- style="background-color:#ccffcc;"
| 11
| 25 November
| Cairns Taipans
| W 114-106
| LaMelo Ball (32)
| LaMelo Ball (11)
| LaMelo Ball (13)
| WIN Entertainment Centre
| 3-8
|- style="background-color:#ffcccc;"
| 12
| 30 November
| @ New Zealand Breakers
| L 91-79
| LaMelo Ball (25)
| LaMelo Ball (12)
| LaMelo Ball (10)
| Spark Arena
| 3-9

|- style="background-color:#ffcccc;"
| 13
| 7 December
| @ Brisbane Bullets
| L 101-91
| Todd Blanchfield, Angus Glover (17)
| Andrew Ogilvy (11)
| Sunday Dech, Emmett Naar (5)
| Nissan Arena
| 3-10
|- style="background-color:#ffcccc;"
| 14
| 16 December
| Melbourne United
| L 73-94
| Angus Glover (15)
| Boone, Hobson, Ogilvy (7)
| Darington Hobson, Emmett Naar (5)
| WIN Entertainment Centre
| 3-11
|- style="background-color:#ccffcc;"
| 15
| 20 December
| @ Adelaide 36ers
| W 84-93
| Sunday Dech (18)
| Andrew Ogilvy (9)
| Emmett Naar (7)
| Adelaide Entertainment Centre 
| 4-11
|- style="background-color:#ffcccc;"
| 16
| 22 December
| New Zealand Breakers
| L 89-91
| Todd Blanchfield (19)
| Andrew Ogilvy (7)
| Emmett Naar (8)
| WIN Entertainment Centre
| 4-12
|- style="background-color:#ffcccc;"
| 17
| 28 December
| @ South East Melbourne Phoenix
| L 112-102
| Todd Blanchfield (22)
| Sunday Dech, Andrew Ogilvy (6)
| Darington Hobson, Emmett Naar (6)
| Melbourne Arena
| 4-13
|- style="background-color:#ccffcc;"
| 18
| 31 December
| Sydney Kings
| W 85-80
| Josh Boone (21)
| Josh Boone (9)
| Emmett Naar (8)
| WIN Entertainment Centre
| 5-13

|- style="background-color:#ffcccc;"
| 19
| 4 January
| Melbourne United
| L 91-104
| Tim Coenraad (18)
| Josh Boone (13)
| Darington Hobson (9)
| WIN Entertainment Centre
| 5-14
|- style="background-color:#ffcccc;"
| 20
| 6 January
| @ Adelaide 36ers
| L 102-96
| Todd Blanchfield (35)
| Josh Boone (basketball) (7)
| Sunday Dech, Darington Hobson (4)
| Adelaide Entertainment Centre
| 5-15
|- style="background-color:#ffcccc;"
| 21
| 10 January
| Perth Wildcats
| L 77-99
| Todd Blanchfield (26)
| Todd Blanchfield (8)
| Angus Glover, Emmett Naar (4)
| WIN Entertainment Centre
| 5-16
|- style="background-color:#ffcccc;"
| 22
| 12 January
| South East Melbourne Phoenix
| L 82-90
| Todd Blanchfield (15)
| Sam Froling (11)
| Darington Hobson, Emmett Naar (3)
| WIN Entertainment Centre
| 5-17
|- style="background-color:#ffcccc;"
| 23
| 18 January
| @ Brisbane Bullets
| L 106-77
| Angus Glover (18)
| Josh Boone (7)
| Emmett Naar (5)
| Nissan Arena
| 5-18
|- style="background-color:#ffcccc;"
| 24
| 24 January
| Sydney Kings
| L 79-102
| Darington Hobson (13)
| Darington Hobson (8)
| Darington Hobson (6)
| WIN Entertainment Centre
| 5-19
|- style="background-color:#ffcccc;"
| 25
| 31 January
| @ Cairns Taipans
| L 99-75
| Josh Boone 19
| Josh Boone 10
| Sunday Dech, Darington Hobson 4
| Cairns Convention Centre
| 5-20

|- style="background-color:#ffcccc;"
| 26
| 2 February
| New Zealand Breakers
| L 56-65
| Josh Boone (14)
| Sunday Dech (6)
| Emmett Naar (8)
| WIN Entertainment Centre
| 5-21
|- style="background-color:#ffcccc;"
| 27
| 8 February
| @ Melbourne United
| L 95-72
| Andrew Ogilvy (15)
| Darington Hobson (7)
| Andrew Ogilvy (7)
| Melbourne Arena 
| 5-22
|- style="background-color:#ffcccc;"
| 28
| 15 February
| @ Sydney Kings
| L 98-82
| Sunday Dech (26)
| Angus Glover (8)
| Angus Glover (4)
| Qudos Bank Arena
| 5-23

Awards

Player of the Week 
Round 6, LaMelo Ball

See also 

 2019–20 NBL season
 Illawarra Hawks

References

External links 

 Official Website

Illawarra Hawks Season
Illawarra Hawks Season
Illawarra Hawks seasons